Cirrochroa aoris, the large yeoman, is a species of nymphalid butterfly found in forested areas of tropical South Asia and Southeast Asia.

See also
 List of butterflies of India (Nymphalidae)

References

Vagrantini
Butterflies of Asia
Butterflies of Indochina
Butterflies described in 1847